In Jainism, Pudgala (or ) is one of the six Dravyas, or aspects of reality that fabricate the world we live in. The six dravyas include the jiva and the fivefold divisions of ajiva (non-living) category: dharma (motion), adharma (rest), akasha (space), pudgala (matter) and kala (time). Pudgala, like other dravyas except kala is called astikaya in the sense that it occupies space. 

Pudgala is derived from the words 'pud', which is defined as Supplement (Addition /Fusion), and gala, which is defined as Disintegrate, or Division or Fission. Therefore, Pudgalas are best defined as all things that are continuously changing by the process of Supplementation or Disintegration, namely matter.

The individual unit of Pudgala is the material from which all is made called a Paramanu, which, by the process of supplementation, can combine to form what can be roughly said is an aggregate, called a Skandha. It possesses at all times four qualities, namely, a color (varna), a taste (rasa), a smell (gandha), and a certain kind of palpability (sparsha, touch).

In Buddhism, Pudgala means the entity that reincarnates as an individual or person, i.e., the bundle of tendencies that keeps an individual reincarnating until they attain enlightenment.

See also
 Tattva (Jainism)
 Dravya (Jainism)
 Ajiva
 Pudgalavada

Notes

References

External links
 The Jaina Philosophy, Pudgala, Surendranath Dasgupta, 1940

Jain philosophical concepts

ko:불교 용어/ㅍ#푸드갈라